Kanker is a Lok Sabha parliamentary constituency in Chhattisgarh.

Assembly segments
Kanker Lok Sabha constituency is reserved for Scheduled Tribes (ST) candidates. It is composed of the following assembly segments:

Members of Parliament

Election results

General election 2019

General election 2014

General election 2009

See also
 Kanker
 List of Constituencies of the Lok Sabha

References

Lok Sabha constituencies in Chhattisgarh
Kanker district
Dhamtari district
Durg district
Bastar district